Trần Thị Thanh Thúy (born November 12, 1997) is a Vietnamese volleyball player. She is the captain of Vietnam women's national volleyball team.

Clubs
  VTV Bình Điền Long An (2010 – 2022)
  Bangkok Glass (2015 – 2016 on loan)
  Attack Line VC (2017 – 2018 on loan)
  Denso Airybees (2019 – 2020 on loan)
  PFU BlueCats (2021 – )

Career

National teams

Senior team
 2014 AVC Cup — 8th Place
 2015 Asian Championship — 5th Place
 2015 SEA Games —  Silver Medal
 2016 AVC Cup — 7th Place
 2017 Asian Championship — 5th Place
 2017 SEA Games —  Bronze Medal
 2018 Asian Games — 6th Place
 2018 AVC Cup — 5th Place
 2019 ASEAN Grand Prix — 4th Place
 2019 SEA Games —  Silver Medal
 2021 SEA Games —  Silver Medal
 2022 AVC Cup — 4th Place
 2022 ASEAN Grand Prix —  Runner-up

U23 team
 2017 Asian Championship —  Bronze Medal
 2019 Asian Peace Cup —   Champion
 2019 Asian Championship —  Bronze Medal

Clubs
 2014 Vietnam League –  Runner-up, with VTV Bình Điền Long An
 2015 Vietnam League –  Bronze medal, with VTV Bình Điền Long An
 2015–16 Thailand League –  Champion, with Bangkok Glass
 2016 Vietnam League –  Bronze medal, with VTV Bình Điền Long An
 2017 Vietnam League –  Champion, with VTV Bình Điền Long An
 2018 Taiwan Volleyball League –  Bronze medal, with Attack Line VC
 2018 Vietnam League –   Champion, with VTV Bình Điền Long An
 2022 Vietnam League –  Bronze medal, with VTV Bình Điền Long An

Awards
2016 VTV9 - Binh Dien International Cup "Best Outside Hitter"
2016 VTV Cup "Best Outside Hitter"
2016 Vietnam League "Best Outside Hitter"
2017 VTV9 - Binh Dien International Cup "Best Outside Hitter"
2017 VTV9 - Binh Dien International Cup "Best Young Player"
2017 Asian U23 Volleyball Championship "Best Outside Hitter"
2017 VTV Cup "Best Outside Hitter"
2017 Vietnam League "Best Outside Hitter"
2018 VTV Cup "Most Valuable Player"
2018 Vietnam League "Most Valuable Player"
2019 Asian Peace Cup "Best Outside Hitter"
2019 Asian U23 Volleyball Championship "Best Outside Hitter"
2022 ASEAN Grand Prix "Best Outside Hitter"

References

Vietnamese women's volleyball players
1997 births
Living people
People from Bình Dương Province
Denso Airybees players
Vietnam women's international volleyball players
Southeast Asian Games silver medalists for Vietnam
Southeast Asian Games bronze medalists for Vietnam
Southeast Asian Games medalists in volleyball
Competitors at the 2015 Southeast Asian Games
Competitors at the 2017 Southeast Asian Games
Volleyball players at the 2018 Asian Games
Competitors at the 2019 Southeast Asian Games
Outside hitters
Asian Games competitors for Vietnam
Vietnamese expatriate sportspeople in Taiwan
21st-century Vietnamese women
Competitors at the 2021 Southeast Asian Games
Vietnamese expatriate sportspeople in Thailand
Vietnamese expatriate sportspeople in Japan